W17EA-D, virtual channel 46 and UHF digital channel 17, is a low-powered religious television station serving southeastern Puerto Rico that is licensed to Arroyo. The station is owned by Ebenezer Broadcasting Group. The station's transmitter is located at Los Veteranos Avenue in Guayama. Its parent station maintains studios on Simón Madera Avenue in San Juan.

Digital channels
The station's digital signal is multiplexed:

External links

17EA-D
Low-power television stations in the United States